Fencing was contested at the 2013 Summer Universiade from July 6 to 12 at the Kazan Equestrian Complex Indoor Hall and the Fencing Sport School in Kazan, Russia.

Medal summary

Medal table

Men's events

Women's events

References

External links
2013 Summer Universiade – Fencing 
Results book

2013 in fencing
Fencing at the Summer Universiade
2013 Summer Universiade events
International fencing competitions hosted by Russia